TVBS News or (TVBS-N) is a Taiwanese pay television channel. Launched in 1995, it is the first 24-hour nationwide news channel in the country.

Newscasts 
Current news sections are named as follows. (All time HKT)

 Morning News (Weekdays: 09:00-12:00, Weekends: 06:00-12:00)
 Good Morning Taiwan (早安台灣) (Weekdays: 05:55-09:00; Weekends: 07:00-09:00)
 Midday News (12:00-14:00)
 Afternoon News (14:00-18:00)
 Evening News (Weekdays: 18:00-20:00; Weekends: 18:00-21:00)
 News Forefront (最前線新聞) (Weekdays: 20:00-21:00)
 2100 News (九點熱話題) (Weekdays: 21:00-21:54; Weekends: 21:00-22:00)
 2200 News (十點不一樣) (Weekdays: 21:54-23:00; Weekends: 22:00-23:00)
 News Night (新聞夜視界) (23:00-01:00)

Logos

See also
 Television Broadcasts Limited

References

External links
  

Television channels and stations established in 1995
TVB
24-hour television news channels in Taiwan
Television news in Taiwan